Mulmangol Station is a station of Busan Metro Line 3 in Yeonsan-dong, Yeonje District, Busan, South Korea.

External links

  Cyber station information from Busan Transportation Corporation

Busan Metro stations
Yeonje District
Railway stations opened in 2005